Ségou Cercle is an administrative subdivision of the Ségou Region of Mali. The administrative center (chef-lieu) is the town of Ségou.

The cercle is divided into 30 communes:

Baguindadougou
Bellen
Boussin
Cinzana
Diédougou
Diganibougou
Dioro
Diouna
Dougabougou
Farako
Farakou Massa
Fatiné
Kamiandougou
Katiéna
Konodimini
Markala
Massala
N'Gara
N'Koumandougou
Pelengana
Sakoïba
Sama Foulala
Saminé
Sansanding
Sébougou
Ségou
Sibila
Soignébougou
Souba
Togou
Different ethnicities are present in Ségou : Bambaras, Fula people, Miniankas, Bozos, Somonos, Dogons and Soninkés.

References

External links
.
.

Cercles of Mali
Ségou Region